Buschiazzo is a surname. Notable people with the surname include:

Fabrizio Buschiazzo (born 1996), Uruguayan footballer
Juan Antonio Buschiazzo (1845–1917), Italian-born Argentine architect and engineer
Maria Esther Buschiazzo (1889–1971), Argentine actress